Willard Frederick Crocker (21 July 1898 or 1900 – 1964)  was a Canadian National singles and doubles tennis champion and Canadian Davis Cup player.

Born in either Newton or Quincy, Massachusetts, Crocker won the 1925 Canadian National Championship defeating American Wallace Scott in the final, 4–6, 9–7, 18–16, 6–2.  He captured three doubles crowns as well, in 1923, 1925, and 1929, all partnering his Davis Cup and McGill Redmen teammate Jack Wright.

Crocker competed in the United States National Championship twice, in 1923 and 1924, reaching the Round of 16 in his second appearance.  He reached the second round in his only appearance at the Wimbledon Championships, defeating Briton Jack Harrison in straight sets before falling to another British player, John Olliff, 2–6, 3–6, 3–6.

Crocker was ranked No. 2 singles player in Canada from 1926 to 1929.  He captured the Canadian Indoor Championship for singles, moreover, in 1923, and was doubles champion three times, partnering Wright, in 1922, 1925, and 1926.  He was also Ontario and Quebec provincial champion, in both singles and doubles, in both 1923 and 1925.

In Davis Cup, Crocker won 5 of 16 matches he played in singles and 3 of 8 in doubles, in ties played from 1923 to 1930.  Canada's best result during Crocker's time with the team was defeating Cuba to reach the America Zone final, in 1927, where they lost to Japan 2–3.

Crocker attended McGill University, studying medicine and later English, and captained the tennis team in 1920 when he captured both the singles and doubles Canadian intercollegiate championships.  He was team president when again won the singles crown in 1923.

Crocker was inducted posthumously into the Canadian Amateur Sports Hall of Fame in addition to the Canadian Tennis Hall of Fame in 1991.  He was inducted into the McGill Redmen Hall of Fame in 1999.

References

Sources
ITF Men's Circuit profile page
Davis Cup player profile page
McGill Redmen Hall of Fame inductee page

Year of birth uncertain
Canadian male tennis players
Canadian people of American descent
McGill University alumni
Sportspeople from Newton, Massachusetts
Sportspeople from Quincy, Massachusetts
Tennis people from Massachusetts
1964 deaths